Enna kodumai Saravanan idhu? (abbreviated to EKSI) is a quote from the 2005 Indian Tamil-language film Chandramukhi spoken by the character Senthilnathan, played by Prabhu. The line has gained popularity as an expression of irony or surprise.

Origin 
In the 2005 Indian Tamil-language film Chandramukhi, actor Prabhu's character Senthilnathan exclaims this to his friend after learning that his wife, Ganga, has an alternate personality, "Chandramukhi".

"Enna Kodumai Saravanan Idhu" literally means "What atrocity is this, Saravanan?" Saravanan, originally a name of the Hindu God Murugan, is also a frequently used personal name in Tamil.

Other usage 
The line, however, gained notable attention and popularity, after being amended slightly to "Enna Kodumai, Sir", used by comedian Premji Amaran in Chennai 600028 (2007). The line is reused by Premji in nearly all his subsequent comedy roles and films that he featured in, becoming his catchphrase. In the 2007 film Sivaji: The Boss, actor Livingston uses the variant "Enna Kodumai Saravanan Sir." The dialogue was also used in the 2019 film Thambi by Karthi. Enna Kodumai Saravanan Ithu is also abbreviated to "EKSI" in chat and SMS language.

See also 
 Chat language
 Text messaging
Famous dialogues

References 

Comedy catchphrases
Quotations from film
2005 neologisms
Tamil language